Fernando Quirarte Gutiérrez (born 17 May 1956) is a Mexican former professional footballer and manager.

He played as a centre-back for the club Guadalajara from 1973 to 1987 and the Mexico national team, earning 45 caps and scoring 5 goals, including two in the 1986 FIFA World Cup.

Later he was the coach of Santos Laguna, Atlas, and Jaguares.

On October 4, 2011, Mexican club Chivas of Guadalajara had demoted coach Jose Luis Real and replaced him with Fernando Quirarte. The change came after Chivas lost 1–0 to Querétaro over the weekend, which extended the club's winless run to four in Mexico's Apertura championship.

Career statistics

International goals
Scores and results list Mexico's goal tally first.

|-
| 1. || August 11, 1984 || Friedrich-Ludwig-Jahn-Sportpark, East Berlin, East Germany ||  || align=center | 1–1 || 1–1 || Friendly
|-
| 2. || June 3, 1986 || Estadio Azteca, Mexico City, Mexico ||  || align=center | 1–0 || align=center | 2–1 || 1986 FIFA World Cup
|- 
| 3. || June 11, 1986 || Estadio Azteca, Mexico City, Mexico ||  || align=center | 1–0 || align=center | 1–0 || 1986 FIFA World Cup
|- 
| 4. || April 28, 1987 || Estadio Nemesio Díez, Toluca, Mexico ||  || align=center | 9–0 || align=center | 13–0 || Friendly
|-
| 5. || February 2, 1987 || Santa Ana Stadium, Santa Ana, United States ||  || align=center | ?–0 || align=center | 9–0 || Friendly
|}

References

1956 births
Living people
Mexico international footballers
1986 FIFA World Cup players
Mexican football managers
Sportspeople from Guadalajara, Jalisco
Liga MX players
C.D. Guadalajara footballers
Chiapas F.C. footballers
Atlas F.C. managers
Santos Laguna managers
Chiapas F.C. managers
C.D. Guadalajara managers
Footballers from Jalisco
Association football defenders
Mexican footballers